General Tao may refer to:
Tao Jun (Three Kingdoms), general of Eastern Wu during the Three Kingdoms period of Chinese history
Tao Kan (259–334), Jin Dynasty Chinese general and governor
Tao Qian (Han Dynasty) (132–194), late Han Dynasty Chinese warlord
Tao Pai Pai, human character in the Dragon Ball anime and manga series known as General Tao in some adaptions

See also
General Tso's chicken, sweet and spicy deep-fried chicken dish also known as "General Tao's chicken"
Zuo Zongtang (1812–1885), Qing Dynasty Chinese general for whom the chicken dish is named